is a Japanese shōjo manga series by Mitsubachi Miyuki. It was serialized in the semi-monthly manga magazine Hana to Yume from November 2013 to December 2021. During the series' run, a drama CD was released with the 10th volume. A live-action short movie was released on Hakusensha's official YouTube channel to promote the release of the 12th volume.

Plot
Yuki Machida, a second-year high school student, is the manager of the school's basketball team and has spent her childhood masking her emotions after years of caring for her five siblings as the eldest. During the welcoming ceremony, she meets Sho Naruse, an impudent student a year her junior who also joins the basketball team. Day after day, Sho tests her patience with his selfish and lecherous comments. However, Yuki is in love with the basketball team's captain, Kido, who had recently gotten a girlfriend. One day, Sho finds out Yuki's feelings for Kido, to her dismay, but he supports her during times of distress. After the final match of the year, Sho admits to Yuki that he is in love with her and declares to win her. Yuki later admits her feelings for Sho and they become a couple.  
They both attend Osaki University after graduating from high school. Sho continues to play college basketball and Yuki begins managing the team.

Characters

Main characters

 (drama CD); Kaho Mizutani (short movie)
Yuki is a second-year high school student and the manager of the basketball team. She is cool-headed and masks her emotions, traits she learned from taking care of her five younger siblings since youth, but she becomes flustered when it comes to Sho. The basketball team values her for being diligent and organized. She later falls in love with Naruse and begins a relationship with him. After graduating from high school she attends Osaki university and majors in sports science.

 (drama CD); Ikumi Isaka (short movie)
Sho is a first-year high school student and a member of the basketball team. He instantly falls for Yuki despite his popularity with the girls, and though his immaturity clashes with her more responsible habits, he becomes persistent in winning her over. They begin dating after Yuki confesses to him. He joins the same university as Yuki after graduating from high school and continues playing college basketball.

Ryuhoku High School

Kido is a third-year high school student and is the captain of the basketball team. Yuki at first has feelings for him, but he and Rina begin dating. He graduates after the final match of the year and starts attending university.

Rina is a third-year-high school student and Kido's bubbly girlfriend.

Arisa is a close friend of Sho's and attended the same junior high school. She has a strong personality and speaks her mind. She has been in love with Sho for a long time, but she later comes to accept his feelings for Yuki.

Misuzu Academy

 (drama CD)
Shizuka is Sho's childhood friend and had attended the same elementary school before relocating to Kyushu. He considers Sho his rival and is motivated to perform well at basketball to defeat him. Though Shizuka has trouble talking to women, he becomes attracted to Yuki and falls in love with her. After graduating Misuzu Academy, he attends the same college as Yuki and Sho. He joins the college basketball team along with Sho. After realising that Yuki will never return his feelings he gives up on her and  encourages Yuki to face her feelings and resolve her issues with Sho.

College

Suwa is a member of the college basketball team and works at the same convenience store as Yuki when she starts attending college. He has a reputation of a playboy and is seen with a different girl constantly; however, he becomes fascinated when Yuki shows no interest in him. He falls in love with her, but he later discovers he is mistaking his feelings for the lack of motherly affection in his own childhood after he became estranged from his mother. Suwa later becomes attracted to Usami when she sees him for his true self.

Usami is Yuki's next-door neighbor and Yuki's best friend who attends the same college. She is in love with Suwa and downplays his advances, believing him still to be in love with Yuki. They become a couple after Suwa declares his love for her.

Media

Manga
Cheeky Brat is written and illustrated by Mitsubachi Miyuki. It was serialized in the bimonthly magazine Hana to Yume from November 2013 to December 2021. The chapters were later released in bound volumes by Hakusensha under the Hana to Yume Comics imprint. During the series' run, a drama CD was released in limited edition bundle of volume 10. Yen Press will publish the series in English.

Short movie
A live-action short movie was released on Hakusensha's official YouTube channel on February 20, 2018 to promote the release of the 12th volume. The film starred Kaho Mizutani as Yuki and Ikumi Isaka as Sho.

Reception

Volume 4 debuted at #19 on Oricon and sold 35,931 copies in its first week. Volume 5 debuted at #26 on Oricon and sold 30,424 copies in its first week, with a total of 54,763 copies sold. Volume 6 debuted at #20 on Oricon and sold 33,036 copies in its first week, with a total of 61,972 copies sold. Volume 7 debuted at #14 on Oricon and sold 55,528 copies in its first week, with a total of 56,027 copies sold. Volume 8 debuted at #14 on Oricon and sold 57,137 copies in its first week. Volume 9 debuted at #11 on Oricon and sold 60,420 copies in its first week, with a total of 61,248 copies sold. Volume 10 debuted at #16 on Oricon and sold 45,871 copies in its first week, with a total of 72,150 copies sold. Volume 11 debuted at #9 on Oricon and sold 57,595 copies in its first week, with a total of 73,899 copies sold. Volume 12 debuted at #5 on Oricon and sold 57,767 copies in its first week. Volume 13 debuted at #10 on Oricon and sold 52,213 copies in its first week, with a total of 75,408 copies sold.

References

External links
 

Basketball in anime and manga
Hakusensha manga
Romance anime and manga
Shōjo manga
Yen Press titles